Jason Neil Gillespie (born 19 April 1975) is an Australian cricket coach and former cricketer who played all three formats of the game. A right-arm fast bowler, he was also a competent lower-order batsman whose unbeaten 201 in his last Test match is the highest score by a night-watchman in international cricket.

Gillespie made his One Day International debut against Sri Lanka at Colombo in the Singer World Series in August 1996, and his Test debut against the West Indies at Sydney in November 1996. He also played for South Australia, Yorkshire and Glamorgan at first-class level, and was an AIS Australian Cricket Academy scholarship holder in 1995.

Gillespie announced his retirement from first-class cricket in Australia in February 2008. He then played in the unauthorised Indian Cricket League for the Ahmedabad Rockets. At the end of the 2008 English domestic season he retired from all first-class cricket.

Personal life 
Jason Gillespie is a descendant on his father's side of the Kamilaroi people of Indigenous Australians, and is the first acknowledged Aboriginal male to become a Test cricketer. His mother has Greek heritage and Jason is the eldest of the three children. He attended Cabra Dominican College in Adelaide, South Australia. Gillespie married Anna (née McEvoy) in 2003. The couple have four children.
Gillespie has another daughter from a previous relationship.

Gillespie is a vegan and has criticised dairy farming and the use of leather balls. While coaching Yorkshire, Gillespie said of the club being sponsored by a dairy: "Yes, they are a sponsor but it doesn't mean I agree with what they do. It's out of my control, just like the fact that cricket balls are made of leather".

Gillespie is an atheist.

International career

Bowling 
Gillespie took 259 wickets in 71 Tests (at an average of 26.13) making him Australia's sixth-highest wicket-taker and giving him the 14th best bowling average for Australian bowlers who have taken more than a hundred wickets.

Gillespie seldom dominated a Test series (the most wickets he took in a series is 20), but he was a reliable support bowler over several years for his more famous teammates Glenn McGrath and Shane Warne. For his performances in 2004, he was named both in the World Test XI and ODI XI by the ICC.

Batting 
Glenn McGrath (61) and Gillespie (54*) shared a last-wicket stand of 114 against New Zealand in 2004 at the Gabba to the hilarity and acclaim of their teammates. It was the first time that either of them had made a 50 in either Test or ODI versions of the game.

In the second Test against Bangladesh at Chittagong on 19 April 2006, Gillespie (201 not out) set the world record (on his 31st birthday) for the highest individual score by a nightwatchman. This was his maiden first-class century. He also shared a fourth-wicket partnership of 320 runs with Michael Hussey. Gillespie was awarded man-of-the-match honours for his double century in the first innings and he was also named man of the series for his efforts that included eight wickets, at an average of 11.3. Due to injury, it was his final match in international cricket. As of 2022, Gillespie is the only nightwatchman to score a double century in a Test match.

Injuries 

He played only 52 from a possible 92 Tests following his debut to his axing during the 2005 Ashes series. Despite these problems, he was both accurate and economical.

In Australia's 1999 tour of Sri Lanka, he was involved in a sickening outfield collision when both he and Steve Waugh were running to take a catch. Waugh was running from the infield towards the outfield, while Gillespie was running in. Waugh dived for the ball resulting in his nose and Gillespie's right leg being broken. The catch was not taken. Gillespie's career was cut short by a shoulder injury while fielding for South Australia, leading to his retirement.

Coaching career
Gillespie became a coach in Zimbabwe in August 2010. He worked primarily with the MidWest Rhinos, but also on "grassroots" activities to improve the performance of young players in Zimbabwe.

Gillespie was drafted in as the bowling coach of Indian Premier League team Kings XI Punjab after their opening match against Pune Warriors in April 2011.

In November 2011, he was named first-team coach of Yorkshire after a shake up in the club's coaching system. In his first season with Yorkshire, they were promoted from Division Two of the County Championship; in the second they were runners-up in the first division; and they won the title in 2014 and 2015, when he was one of the candidates to coach England. He returned to Australia after Yorkshire narrowly missed out on a third successive title in 2016.

In April 2015, Gillespie was named as the coach of the Adelaide Strikers team in the Big Bash League.

In July 2017, Gillespie was appointed as the interim head coach for the Papua New Guinea national team replacing former New Zealand Test player, Dipak Patel.

In 2018, Gillespie took up the position of head coach of Sussex.

In August 2020, Gillespie was appointed the new coach of South Australia.

In 2021, Gillespie was named an Australia Post Legend of Cricket.

Career best performances

References

External links

Australia One Day International cricketers
Australia Test cricketers
Australia Twenty20 International cricketers
Australian expatriate sportspeople in England
Gamilaraay
South Australia cricketers
Yorkshire cricketers
Glamorgan cricketers
Wisden Cricketers of the Year
Indigenous Australian cricketers
Australian people of Greek descent
1975 births
Living people
Cricketers from Sydney
Ahmedabad Rockets cricketers
Australian cricketers
Australian cricket coaches
Australian Institute of Sport cricketers
Big Bash League coaches
Veganism in Australia
Australian atheists
Coaches of the Papua New Guinea national cricket team